Spodoptera latifascia,  commonly known as the lateral-lined armyworm, garden armyworm, or velvet armyworm, is a moth of the  family Noctuidae found from Central America and the Antilles into North America (from Texas to Florida).

Description
The wingspan is about 42 mm.

Phenology
Adults are on wing from March to October depending on the location.

Geography
Type Locality: Jamaica

Taxonomy
Walker (1856) originally described latifascia, placing it in the genus Prodenia.

Basionym: Prodenia latifascia Walker, 1856.

Pogue (2002) revived S. cosmioides (Walker, 1858), as a valid species (though mis-spelled as S. cosmiodes), from synonymy of S. latifascia.

References

External links
Bug Guide

latifascia
Moths of North America
Moths of the Caribbean
Moths of Central America
Moths of South America
Moths of Cuba
Lepidoptera of Brazil
Lepidoptera of Jamaica
Moths described in 1856